Cepheidae is a family of jellyfish.

References

External links

 
Kolpophorae
Cnidarian families